The National Curriculum and Textbook Board (NCTB) is an autonomous organisation under the Ministry of Education in Bangladesh, responsible for the development of curriculums, production and distribution of textbooks at primary and secondary education levels.

All public schools and also a lot of private schools of Bangladesh follow the curricula of the NCTB. Starting in 2010, every year free books are distributed to students between Grade-1 to Grade-10 to eliminate illiteracy. These books comprise most of the curricula of the majority of Bangladeshi schools. There are two versions to each national curriculum. One is the Bengali language version and the other one is English language version.

History 
National Curriculum and Textbook Board traces its origins to the East Pakistan School Textbook Board which was established in 1954. In 1971, the Bangladesh School Textbook Board was established. In 1976 it was constituted as the National Curriculum and Syllabus Committee and the National Curriculum Development Centre was established in 1981. National Curriculum Development Centre and the Bangladesh School Textbook Board were merged in 1983 to form the Bangladesh National Textbook Board which was later renamed to National Curriculum and Textbook Board.

References

Education in Bangladesh
Government agencies of Bangladesh
Textbook business
1983 establishments in Bangladesh